The Men's 1500 metres race of the 2016 World Single Distances Speed Skating Championships was held on 11 February 2016.

Results
The race was started at 18:07.

References

Men's 1500 metres